The Everglades Hotel was a historic hotel located in Downtown Miami, Florida. At 23 floors, it was once the largest hotel in the city. The construction was completed just before the Great Miami Hurricane of 1926, which flooded the lobby. 

Television station WTVJ (channel 4, now 6) originally had its transmitter atop the hotel when it signed on the air in 1949.

The building was demolished on January 23, 2005, to make room for a new building. Originally named "Everglades on the Bay" in its honor, the new building was later renamed Vizcayne.

References

External links
Video of implosion

1926 establishments in Florida
2004 disestablishments in Florida
Hotel buildings completed in 1926
History of Miami
Hotels in Miami
Demolished hotels in Florida
Hotels established in 1926
Buildings and structures demolished in 2005
Demolished buildings and structures in Miami
Buildings and structures demolished by controlled implosion